James McCullough Sr. (May 12, 1928 – April 6, 2012) was an American film director and producer who wrote and directed several horror films in the 1980s.

Early life
McCullough was born in Mansfield, Louisiana, and raised in Lebanon, Missouri.

Career
He formed Jim McCullough Productions after graduating from the University of California, Los Angeles. While a student, he appeared in CBS's live-action Playhouse 90 Theater. In 1974, he co-produced Where the Red Fern Grows (1974). Prior to establishing his film company, McCullough had two minor acting credits in Teenage Monster (1958) and The Love Bug (1971).

His directorial debut was Charge of the Model T's (1977), followed by the horror film Mountaintop Motel Massacre (1983), and the science-fiction film The Aurora Encounter (1986). His last directorial credit was 1994's The St. Tammany Miracle, which he co-directed with Joy N. Houck Jr.

Personal life
McCullough had two children: James Jr., and Cathy, with his wife Lel.

Filmography

Acting credits:

References

External links

1928 births
2012 deaths
Film directors from Louisiana
University of California, Los Angeles alumni